Gordon Colin Connell (born 3 October 1944) is a former  international rugby union player.

He was capped five times for Scotland as a scrum-half between 1968 and 1970. He scored one drop goal for Scotland.

Connell was called up as a late replacement for the 1968 British Lions tour to South Africa. With both scrum halves (Gareth Edwards and Roger Young) injured he played in the last three games on tour including the 4th Test against .

He played club rugby for Trinity Academicals and later London Scottish.  He was also the first player to come onto an international field (Murrayfield) as a substitute for an injured player (Ian McCrae of Gordonians and Scotland).

References

1944 births
Living people
British & Irish Lions rugby union players from Scotland
Rugby union scrum-halves
Scotland international rugby union players
Scottish rugby union players
Trinity Academicals RFC players